and  are 2004 role-playing video games developed and published by Capcom for the Game Boy Advance (GBA) handheld game console. Combined, they make up the fifth mainline installment in the Mega Man Battle Network series, and follows Lan Hikari and his NetNavi MegaMan.EXE, as they attempt to take down Nebula, who have kidnapped Lan's father and taken over the internet, with an anti-Nebula task force.

Development on the game started during the localization of Battle Network 4, and alongside the development 4.5: Real Operation. It was announced in CoroCoro Comics in August 2004, with Team ProtoMan releasing in December 2004 in Japan; Team Colonel released three months later in February 2005, while both versions were released simultaneously for Western territories in June 2005. Battle Network 5 retains the same gameplay as its predecessor, but with the addition of "Liberation Missions" where the player must liberate squares with limited time to defeat the boss. The game also includes crossover content with the Boktai series by Konami.

The GBA versions were re-released as part of the Wii U Virtual Console in 2015, and are planned to be included in the Mega Man Battle Network Legacy Collection for PlayStation 4, Nintendo Switch and PC (via Steam), in 2023. It was followed up by Mega Man Battle Network 6 in 2005, which acted as the finale of the series.

Gameplay

The gameplay of Mega Man Battle Network 5 is largely similar to that of its predecessors. The player explores the real world through Lan and the Net through MegaMan.EXE. When Lan plugs his PET, a handheld computer, into a computer with an interface jack, he can upload MegaMan.EXE to the cyber network, allowing him to explore and fight viruses as random encounters.

When MegaMan.EXE encounters viruses, the screen shifts to a battle screen set on a six by three square grid. On the left half of the grid is MegaMan.EXE, and on the other half are his opponents. MegaMan.EXE has a relatively weak arm cannon, the Mega Buster, but his main weapon is Lan's library of battle chips, one-use-per-battle special attacks which grant various abilities, including simple attacks, attack enhancements, defensive effects, terrain transmogrification, or assistance from other NetNavis. Before battle, the player can construct a folder consisted of thirty battle chips, and each turn of a battle (measured by a timer bar at the top of the screen), the player is presented with a random selection of these chips. The player can send MegaMan.EXE up to five battle chips, after which the battle takes place in real time, with MegaMan.EXE, controlled by the player, attacking with his Mega Buster, dodging attacks, or activating battle chips from his queue.

MegaMan.EXE joins a team led by either Lan's and MegaMan.EXE's rivals Chaud and ProtoMan.EXE or new characters Baryl and Colonel.EXE, and the members of this team assist MegaMan in various ways. MegaMan.EXE can take on the attributes of one of his teammates with a Soul Unison. The team plays its largest role in Liberation Missions, wherein MegaMan.EXE and the rest of his team enter a part of the Nebula-controlled Internet to free the area via a time-limited battle with a group of viruses. The Dark Chip system from the previous game was also reworked, with them now having to be obtained; it is also possible to use them to activate a "Chaos Unison", which resembles a normal Soul Unison with the main difference being that the Mega Buster is replaced with the effects of the Dark Chip he used for the Chaos Unison. While using this effect doesn't cause HP loss, it has to be done with careful timing, as charging with poor timing will end the Chaos Unison and cause an invincible, evil version of MegaMan.EXE to join the viruses and attack him for a short period of time using random battle chips.

Much like previous games in the series, Game Boy Advance copies of Mega Man Battle Network 5 can connect using the Game Boy Advance link cable to battle head-to-head or to trade battle chips. Battle Network 5 also includes content referencing the Boktai series by Konami, such as a crossover battle feature unlocked by combining both Battle Network 5 and Boktai 2: Solar Boy Django.

Story

Lan Hikari and his friends, Dex, Mayl and Yai, are called to the SciLab headquarters for the announcement of the latest research project that Lan's father, Yuichiro, has been working on. Before he can reveal it to them, mysterious agents take over SciLab, subduing everyone with sleeping gas, kidnapping Yuichiro, and stealing their PETs (a device that contains the program avatars called NetNavis). However, Lan was in a different section of the lab and avoids being discovered or having his PET stolen. The agents turn out to be working for Dr. Regal and his crime syndicate Nebula, which has returned after being defeated in Mega Man Battle Network 4. Nebula subsequently takes over the Net with an army of viruses and Darkloids: NetNavis that use dark powers and Dark Chips.

While investigating a disturbance at SciLab, Lan meets either Chaud (in Team ProtoMan) or newcomer Baryl (in Team Colonel), who recruit him to begin forming an elite team of NetNavis to fight against Nebula's control. In a series of scenarios identical between games, Lan meets up with other powerful NetNavi operators and recruits them; Team ProtoMan grows to consist of Magnet Man, Gyro Man, Napalm Man, Search Man, and Meddy, while Team Colonel consists of Knight Man, Shadow Man, Tomahawk Man, Number Man, and Toad Man. Through the team's efforts, the Net is liberated area by area and peace gets restored. However, the occupation of the Net was a diversion by Nebula while they searched for "The Hikari Report", a research project by Lan's grandfather Dr. Hikari.

Starting with a clue from an encrypted message on Yuichiro's lab computer, Lan and MegaMan.EXE discover digital snapshots of the real world in the past called VisionBursts which are hidden in the net. By piecing together clues left by Dr. Hikari in these areas, they discover he hid the Hikari Report in one of the VisionBursts, but Regal finds it first and claims it. The Hikari Report is explained to be a research project undertaken by Hikari and Dr. Wily to create SoulNet, an internet network connecting the minds and souls of humans and NetNavis across the world. The two believed SoulNet could bring peace and unity, but were unable to finish their research. Regal intends to unleash Nebula Grey, a program of pure hatred and darkness, upon the completed SoulNet, corrupting all humans and NetNavis in the world. Lan also discovers that Regal is Dr. Wily's son, and the two scientists intended for their children to complete their project.

Lan's team storms Nebula's base and battles through it until Lan confronts Regal in the SoulNet server room. MegaMan.EXE seals Nebula Grey and the room begins to self-destruct. While the heroes evacuate, Yuichiro stays behind to speak to Regal about the research of their fathers. He collapses as Regal rejects the idea that he could reform, and a voice calls out to him and orders SoulServer to overload. In Team ProtoMan the speaker is unseen, while in Team Colonel Dr. Wily enters the room and gives the command. Lan narrates that an unknown figure saved his father from the destruction of Nebula's base, and Yuichiro calls the group to SciLab to meet Dr. Regal, who has had many of his memories erased by SoulServer and is now a peaceful scientist. Lan's friends and NetNavis visit the VisionBurst of the ACDC Town of the past as Yuichiro speaks to Lan and MegaMan.EXE about the hope for another world passed down through the generations that they will one day carry with them.

Development and release

Development of the game started during the localization of Mega Man Battle Network 4, and during the development of Rockman.EXE 4.5: Real Operation (2004). The developers described this period at Capcom as a difficult time. The game was first advertised in the Japanese magazine CoroCoro Comics in August 2004.

Team ProtoMan released in Japan on December 9, 2004, while Team Colonel released three months later on February 24, 2005; the reason for this delay is unknown, since both games were finalized at roughly the same time. Viewers of the anime film Rockman.EXE the Movie: Program of Light and Darkness would also receive a special copy of Team Colonel with an e-Reader card for the transformation "BassCross MegaMan". Both versions of Battle Network 5 were released simultaneously on June 10, 2005, in Europe, and June 21, 2005 in North America.

The Game Boy Advance versions were re-released onto the Wii U Virtual Console in Japan on September 9, 2015, and in North America on December 12, 2015. The games are also planned for inclusion in the Mega Man Battle Network Legacy Collection for PlayStation 4, Nintendo Switch and PC via Steam, scheduled for release in 2023.

Double Team DS 

In May 2005, it was officially announced that both games would be coming to the Nintendo DS as Mega Man Battle Network 5: Double Team DS, although its existence was previously hinted at when Nintendo Power added an untitled Battle Network game to its release schedule. It was released in Japan on July 21, 2005, and in North America on November 1, 2005. Its European release was announced on February 7, 2005, and released there on April 13 of the same year, while its Australian release was delayed to April 2007.

The port leaded by main planner and writer Tsukana Takenaka, who stated that the port was requested by producer with the initial goal of combining both GBA versions into one game, and including an opening movie. The DS version was also handled by 14 other people. The DS version added additional content, including a new transformation for MegaMan called SoulCross, unlocked by putting a copy of Boktai 2 into the GBA cartridge slot, and being able to swap between Navis during fights.

The developers had also experimented with fully 3D graphics early on, as 3D models of several areas and characters were found within the data of Mega Man Star Force, although Christian Svennson, who served as Capcom's Vice President of Strategic Planning & Business Development, theorized in 2009 that the assets may have been made as a test of the DS' capabilities.

Reception

Sales
Mega Man Battle Network 5: Team ProtoMan was the 48th best-selling game in Japan in 2004 at 255,061 copies. This version was also the 55th best-selling game in the country in 2005 at 211,099 copies. Mega Man Battle Network 5: Team Colonel placed at number 65 with 194,472 copies sold that year. Mega Man Battle Network 5: Double Team DS was the 52nd best-selling Nintendo DS game in Japan in 2005 at 106,526 copies.

In North America, Team ProtoMan was the tenth best-selling handheld game in July 2005.

Critical response

In North America, both the Game Boy Advance and Nintendo DS versions of Mega Man Battle Network 5 met with fairly tepid critical reception, with Metacritic and GameRankings aggregate scores ranging from 66% to 70% across the different versions. Reviewers often highlighted the reuse of aging art and sound assets from previous games, comparing them unfavorably with contemporary Game Boy Advance games, as well as the lack of changes from its predecessors. Craig Harris said in his review for IGN "Even though this sequel can be considered "the best in the series so far," Battle Network 5 doesn't add all that much to the series."

The Liberation Missions were also poorly received by reviews, with the general consensus being that they only slowed down the game; GameSpy wrote that "Perhaps if the concept was fleshed out in a spin-off title, the experience would feel more complete than the "Final Fantasy Tactics for Dummies" vibe that it has now." Reviewers praised the DS version for including both games, as well as a new map system, but felt that it hadn't utilize the system's features to their full extent.

Reviews weren't entirely unfavorable, especially when the topic of Battle Network 5's predecessor was concerned. GameSpot, in particular, compared it favorably with Battle Network 4. Japanese reviews were also more positive, with Famitsu scoring the GBA and DS versions 36/40 and 31/40 respectively.

Notes

References

External links
Official website 

Role-playing video games
Game Boy Advance games
5
Nintendo DS games
Multiplayer and single-player video games
Tactical role-playing video games
2004 video games
Video games developed in Japan
Video games scored by Akari Kaida
Video games scored by Yoshino Aoki
Video games with alternative versions
Virtual Console games
Virtual Console games for Wii U